Silivaş may refer to several villages in Romania:

 Silivaş, a village in Hopârta Commune, Alba County
 Silivaş, a village in the town of Gherla, Cluj County